Made in Israel is a 2001 Israeli drama film directed by Ari Folman.

Cast 
 Menashe Noy - Eddie Zanzury
 Jenya Dodina - Dodo
 Jürgen Holtz - Egon Schultz
 Sasson Gabai - Perach 
 Dror Keren - Tiktak
 Igor Mirkurbanov - Vitali
 Tzahi Grad - Segal

External links 

2001 drama films
2001 films
Israeli drama films
2000s Hebrew-language films
Films directed by Ari Folman